Woolfardisworthy is a village and civil parish in the Torridge district in the English county of Devon. The village is accessible via the A39 road,  from the village.

Name
The name of the village is a local curiosity, as its pronunciation (and occasional spelling) differs from what one might expect. On local signs, the village is sometimes marked as Woolsery alongside the original name. This is due to the pronunciation of the village's name being . The name also provides evidence for the power of the written word in conserving place-names: the shortened pronunciation is known to have been in use since the 17th century.

According to the Oxford Dictionary of English Place Names (Eilert Ekwall, 4th ed., 1960), the origin of the name is probably "Wulfheard's homestead". The element "worthy" is from Old English worþig, one of several words used by the Anglo-Saxons to denote a homestead, farmstead or small settlement.

Woolfardisworthy (the full name) - along with a few other places in Devon, is one of the longest place names in England with 16 letters.

All Hallows Church
In the parish church dedicated to All Hallows is the large monument with effigy to Richard Cole (d.1614) of Buckish within the parish, also of Slade in the parish of Cornworthy, Devon. It is a Grade 1 British Listed Building.

Organisations
The Centre for Fortean Zoology is based here.

References

External links
 

Torridge District
Villages in Devon